Ludwig Wilhelm Karl von Lauter was a Prussian General der Artillerie who was involved in World War I.

Life 

Lauter was born on 23 April 1855 in the Grand Duchy of Hesse. He joined the military in 1872 as a second lieutenant. In was made a premier-lieutenant in 1881, hauptmann in 1886, and major in 1891. By 1904 he was a Generalmajor and in 1911 was promoted to General der Artillerie and appointed as Inspector General of Foot Artillery. In 1913, Lauter was ennobled. During World War I he continued to serve on this post, attached to the Great Headquarters, until 15 October 1917, retiring on the next day. He died at Heidelberg on 8 April 1929.

References 

1855 births
1929 deaths
Military personnel from Hesse
German untitled nobility
German Army generals of World War I
Generals of Artillery (Prussia)